National Film Awards may refer to:

 National Film Awards (Bangladesh)
 National Film Awards (India)
 National Film Awards (Nepal)
 National Film Awards UK

See also
List of film awards
 Thailand National Film Association Awards